Castellucchio is a comune (municipality) in the Province of Mantua in the Italian region Lombardy, located about  southeast of Milan and about  west of Mantua.

Castellucchio borders the following municipalities: Curtatone, Gazoldo degli Ippoliti, Marcaria, Rodigo.

Notable people
 
 
Roberto Montorsi (born 1951), former footballer

References

Cities and towns in Lombardy